Camelback Mountain is a mountain in Phoenix, Arizona, United States.

Camelback Mountain may also refer to:

 Camelback Mountain (Big Pocono), Pennsylvania
 Camelback Mountain Resort